The 2012–13 EWHL season was the ninth season of the Elite Women's Hockey League, a multi-national women's ice hockey league. Six teams participated in the league, and HK Pantera Minsk of Belarus won the championship for the first time.

Regular season

Playoffs
The top four teams from the regular season qualified for the playoffs.

Semifinals
HK Pantera Minsk - EV Bozen Eagles 6:1 (0:1, 3:0, 3:0)
EHV Sabres Vienna - DEC Salzburg Eagles 8:1 (3:0, 3:0, 2:1)

3rd place game
DEC Salzburg Eagles - EV Bozen Eagles 2:1 (2:0, 0:1, 0:0)

Final
HK Pantera Minsk - EHV Sabres Vienna 6:1 (2:0, 4:0, 0:1)

Top scorers

External links
EWHL official website

Women's
European Women's Hockey League seasons
Euro